Charles Hertsenberg (born March 18, 1986) is an American soccer player who last played for the Dayton Dutch Lions. In 2013, he joined the Cincinnati Saints of the Professional Arena Soccer League.

Career

as Player

Youth 
Hertsenberg played in his youth for the Ohio Elite Soccer Academy, TCYO United, Indoor soccer for Professional Arena Soccer League 1790 Cincinnati Express. Besides his studies on the Elder High School for the Panthers, the Surge as part of the Cincinnati State College and from 2006 to 2007 for the OD Panthers as Ohio Dominican University student.

Senior 
Hertsenberg started his senior career 2008 with Cincinnati Kings and joined in December 2010 to the Dayton Dutch Lions in the USL Professional Division.

After one and a half year left the Dutch Lions and joined on October 28, 2011 to German-based Bezirksliga Oberbayern-Süd club FC Phönix München. In July signed 2012 signed for Landesliga Südost side FC Deisenhofen and returned to Dutch Lions on November 1, 2012.

as Coach 
He was named in December 2010 as Head coach of the Dayton Dutch Lions Women's Academy. After his return on 1 November 2012 worked as Head Coach of the men Dayton Dutch Lions Academy.

Notes

1986 births
Living people
American soccer players
American expatriate soccer players in Germany
Dayton Dutch Lions players
USL League Two players
USL Championship players
Cincinnati Kings players
Association football midfielders
American people of Dutch descent
American expatriate soccer players